Camilla Møllebro Pedersen (born 21 May 1984) is a Danish former professional racing cyclist. She rode in the women's time trial at the 2015 UCI Road World Championships.

Major results

2014
 3rd Time trial, National Road Championships
2015
 2nd Time trial, National Road Championships
 8th Overall BeNe Ladies Tour
 10th Time trial, European Games
2016
 10th Pajot Hills Classic
2017
 1st  Road race, National Road Championships
 1st Mountains classification Tour of Zhoushan Island

References

External links
 
 

1984 births
Living people
Danish female cyclists
Place of birth missing (living people)
Cyclists at the 2015 European Games
European Games competitors for Denmark
21st-century Danish women